"The Vulture (Acts I & II)" is a song by the British hardcore punk band Gallows, released as the first single from their second album, Grey Britain. On the UK Singles Chart, it reached a peak of number 56.

Former Gallows frontman Frank Carter told Kerrang!: "I was thinking about all the forgotten children who die before their parents, and this song is about one of those poor bastards becoming Death's apprentice."

Track listing

CD Version
The Vulture (Act II)

Digital version
The Vulture (Act II)
The Vulture (Acts I & II)

Music video
The music video for "The Vulture (Acts I & II)" was released on 26 March 2009. It involves the band playing one scene in formal attire, integrated with another scene with the band stripped, covered in blood.

References

External links
 Music video

2009 singles
Gallows (band) songs
2009 songs
Warner Records singles
Music videos directed by Adam Powell